This is a list of all cricketers who have played first-class cricket for Combined Services (Pakistan) cricket team. The team played thirty-seven first-class matches between 1953 and 1979. Seasons given are first and last seasons; the player did not necessarily play in all the intervening seasons.

Players

 Abdul Waheed, 1954/55
 Abdur Rehman, 1953/54-1960/61
 Aftab Ahmed, 1953/54
 Ahmed Saeed, 1955/56
 Ahmed Shamshad, 1953/54-1959/60
 Aminuddin, 1956/57
 Anis Ahmed, 1962/63-1963/64
 Anwar Saeed, 1953/54-1954/55
 Arshad, 1978/79
 Asadullah Qureshi, 1954/55-1956/57
 Baseer Shamsi, 1953/54-1960/61
 Bokhari, 1978/79
 Buland Iqbal, 1976/77-1978/79
 R. Crosse, 1962/63
 Dildar Awan, 1958/59-1964/65
 Faiz Ahmed, 1964/65
 Faiz Mohammad, 1978/79
 Farooq Ahmed, 1959/60
 Fawad Zaman, 1959/60-1960/61
 Fazal Abbas, 1977/78
 Mohammed Ghazali, 1953/54-1955/56
 Ghulam Mohiuddin, 1954/55-1956/57
 Hamid Butt, 1961/62
 Iftikhar Ahmed, 1964/65
 Imtiaz Ahmed, 1953/54-1964/65
 Imtiaz Bhatti, 1962/63
 Iqbal Awan, 1976/77-1979/80
 Iqbal Kashmiri, 1978/79-1979/80
 Irtiza Hussain, 1961/62
 Javed Ahmed, 1977/78-1978/79
 Javed Akhtar, 1962/63-1963/64
 Javed-ur-Rehman, 1976/77-1978/79
 Abdul Hafeez Kardar, 1953/54-1954/55
 Khalid Khwaja, 1953/54-1958/59
 Khalid Masood, 1955/56
 Majeed Qureshi, 1956/57
 Masood Mahmood, 1953/54
 Mazhar Siddiqi, 1953/54-1961/62
 Mazhar-ul-Haq, 1964/65
 Miran Bakhsh, 1954/55-1956/57
 Mohammad Abid, 1963/64
 Mohammad Afzal, 1962/63-1963/64
 Mohammad Iqbal, 1978/79
 Mohammad Pervez, 1963/64
 Mohammad Sabir, 1963/64
 Mohammad Shafi, 1978/79
 Mohammad Yousuf, 1963/64
 Mukhtar Cheema, 1953/54
 Munir Malik, 1962/63-1963/64
 Najam Sohail, 1976/77-1978/79
 Najibullah Niazi, 1978/79
 Naushad Ali, 1976/77-1979/80
 Nayyar Hussain, 1958/59-1977/78
 Nisar Qureshi, 1954/55
 Nuzhat Hussain, 1961/62
 M. Pengari, 1958/59-1964/65
 Qadir Jan, 1978/79
 Qamar Yousuf, 1953/54-1956/57
 Rahat Latif, 1958/59
 Rahimuddin, 1954/55-1956/57
 Saad Hatmi, 1956/57-1960/61
 Sajid, 1978/79
 Salahuddin, 1959/60-1961/62
 Salahuddin, 1977/78
 Saleem Iqbal, 1954/55-1960/61
 Saleem Sheikh, 1958/59-1961/62
 Saleem Tahir, 1954/55-1964/65
 Sarfraz Ahmed, 1964/65
 Shafaat Ahmed, 1960/61-1964/65
 Shakeeluddin, 1958/59-1961/62
 Shamim, 1976/77
 Shujauddin Butt, 1953/54-1963/64
 Sultan Khan, 1976/77-1978/79
 Syed Ali, 1958/59-1964/65
 Talat Lodhi, 1976/77
 Tanvir Hussain, 1962/63
 Taqi Shah, 1977/78-1979/80
 Tariq Mahmood, 1976/77-1979/80
 Tariq Shafi, 1962/63-1976/77
 Waqar Hasan, 1953/54
 Yousuf Siddiqi, 1960/61-1961/62
 Zafar Ahmed, 1953/54-1958/59
 Zafar Mahmood, 1976/77-1979/80
 Zakauddin, 1956/57
 Ziauddin Burney, 1962/63-1963/64

References

Combined Services (Pakistan) cricketers